Morogh Ó Flaithbheartaigh was King of Iar Connacht and Chief of the Name.

Biography
Morogh was the first chief of the clan after their final expulsion from Uí Briúin Seóla. King Áed in Gai Bernaig of Connacht had begun their subjugation in 1051, but it was only with the encastallation of Muintir Murchada under Richard Mor de Burgh that the family were finally driven to the west side of Lough Corrib. The rest of their history as an independent people would be as rulers of Iar Connacht, or as it is now known, Connemara. 

Moroghand and his brother, Ruaidhri, his brother may have accompanied Felim mac Cathal Crobderg Ua Conchobair (reigned 1233–1256), on an expedition to Wales in 1245 under Henry III. This would have been on Henry III's campaign against Prince Dafydd ap Llywelyn of Gwynedd. 

It is not known when Morogh died, so it is not certain if an annals entry of 1248 refers to him. It states: "The entire of Conmaicne Mara was plundered by the English. The English went upon an expedition against O'Flaherty, who defeated them, and killed numbers of them." In 1256 Ruaidhri is listed as the Ó Flaithbheartaigh.

See also

 Ó Flaithbertaigh

References
 West or H-Iar Connaught, Ruaidhrí Ó Flaithbheartaigh, 1684 (published 1846, ed. James Hardiman).
 Origin of the Surname O'Flaherty, Anthony Matthews, Dublin, 1968, p. 40.
 Irish Kings and High-Kings, Francis John Byrne (2001), Dublin: Four Courts Press, 
 Both King and Vassal: Feidlim Ua Conchobair of Connacht, 1230-65, Freya Verstraten, pp. 13–37, Journal of the Galway Archaeological and Historical Society, Volume 55, 2003
 Annals of Ulster at CELT: Corpus of Electronic Texts at University College Cork

People from County Galway
Medieval Gaels from Ireland
Morogh
13th-century Irish monarchs
Irish lords